"Shine" is a song by British reggae group Aswad. The song was written by Joe Cang and Aswad, who also produced it. Released on 6 June 1994 in a radically remixed form courtesy of the Beatmasters, it was the first single from the group's seventeenth album, Rise and Shine (1994). It is the band's second-biggest hit in the United Kingdom, after 1988's "Don't Turn Around", reaching number five on the UK Singles Chart. "Shine" also became a top-40 hit in several European countries and New Zealand.

Critical reception
James Hamilton from Music Week'''s RM'' Dance Update described the song as a "bouncy reggae bubbler".

Music video
A music video was made to accompany the song, directed by D. Red. It was A-listed on France's MCM in November 1994.

Charts

Weekly charts

Year-end charts

Certifications

References

Aswad (band) songs
1994 singles
1994 songs